Zephyr was built on the River Thames in 1790 as a West Indiaman. From c.1796 she started to serve the British East India Company (EIC) as a packet ship. However, a French privateer captured her in 1798.

Career
Zephyr entered Lloyd's Register in 1791 with T. Scott, master, and trade London-St Vincent.

After the commencement of the French Revolutionary Wars in 1793, Captain Thomas Scott received a letter of marque on 9 March.

On 30 December 1795, Messrs. St Barbe, Green, and Bignell offered Zephyr, and another brig, Aurora, to the Committee of Shipping of the EIC. The next day the Committee replied that as the EIC had decided not to engage any vessels of under 400 tons burthen, it would decline the offer.

Lloyd's List reported on 11 October 1796 that Zephyr had arrived at Dover from Demerara. As she arrived in English waters she saw a brig founder at Lands End.

The next year the EIC reversed its earlier policy and engaged Zephyr as a packet. Lloyd's Register for 1797 shows her trade changing from Cork—San Domingo to London—East India.

Loss
Zephyr, which was under the command of Captain John Scott, was no match for Vengeance, which was armed with 24 guns and had a crew of 215 men. Vengeance sent Zephyr into Bordeaux. The EIC valued its cargo on Zephyr at £2,554.

Notes, citations, and references
Notes

Citations

References
 
 
  
 Proceedings Relative to Ships Tendered for the Service of the United East-India Company, from the Twenty-sixth of March, 1794, to the Sixth of January, 1795: With an Appendix.

1790 ships
Age of Sail merchant ships
Merchant ships of the United Kingdom
Ships of the British East India Company
Captured ships